Mansikka is a surname, meaning strawberry in Finnish. It may refer to:

Martti Mansikka (born 1933), Finnish gymnast
Samuli Mansikka (1978–2015), Finnish mountaineer and trekking guide
Tommy Mansikka-Aho, Finnish folk and popular music musician, member of Finnish band Edea

Finnish-language surnames